Boschetto is an Italian surname. Notable people with the surname include:

Giuseppe Boschetto (1841–1918), Italian painter
Ignazio Boschetto (born 1994), Italian singer
Laurence Boschetto (born 1954), American chief executive

See also
Boschetto v. Hansing

Italian-language surnames